Lake Pulaski is a lake in Wright County, in the U.S. state of Minnesota.

Lake Pulaski was named for Casimir Pulaski, a Polish military commander and American Revolutionary War hero.

See also
List of lakes in Minnesota

References

Lakes of Minnesota
Lakes of Wright County, Minnesota